Problepsis eucircota is a moth of the  family Geometridae. It is found in China and Japan.

References

Moths described in 1913
Scopulini
Moths of Asia
Moths of Japan